Lettered Oak was an unincorporated community within Clinton County, Kentucky, United States.

References

Unincorporated communities in Clinton County, Kentucky
Unincorporated communities in Kentucky